MV Red Falcon is a Raptor Class vehicle and passenger ferry operated by Red Funnel on their route from Southampton to East Cowes on the Isle of Wight. She was built by Ferguson Shipbuilders in Port Glasgow.

She first entered service in 1994, being bought new by Red Funnel along with sister ship Red Osprey and as such, has operated the same regular route throughout her life. Between January and March 2004 she underwent modifications by Remontowa in Gdańsk, Poland, in order to increase vehicle capacity by 80 and allow a greater passenger capacity.

2014 refit

From February to April 2014, Red Falcon was in a drydock at Portsmouth for a major refit costing over £2 million. The refit provides an extra level of passenger accommodation with 55% more seating. The environmental footprint of the vessel was also reduced by installing LED lighting, and recycling facilities. A pair of webcams on top of the ship's bridge were also replaced, and provide footage of the ferry's journey.

Events
On 10 March 2006, Red Falcon collided with the linkspan in Southampton, causing significant damage to the ferry's 'Southampton Side' bow doors. Vehicles, including an ambulance carrying a patient (evacuated by dinghy) had to remain onboard for over eight hours while engineers forced the door open. On 11 November 2008, the Red Falcon was used on an excursion to view Queen Elizabeth 2 leaving Southampton for the final time.

On 29 September 2018 the ferry collided with a  motor yacht while approaching East Cowes, injuring two people on the yacht but sustaining no damage herself. Both vessels were travelling from Southampton to Cowes.

On 21 October 2018, the ferry collided with several yachts, sinking one named Greylag, and ran aground on the Isle of Wight while trying to berth at East Cowes. A search and rescue mission was started after people nearby heard 'voices from the water', but this was called off after the voices were attributed to people on a nearby boat calling to the lifeboats in attendance. Heavy fog hampered the search and a helicopter searching the area had to turn back due to low visibility. Lifeboats from Cowes and Calshot were in attendance. Red Falcon was refloated with the assistance of tugs and docked in East Cowes. There were no reported injuries. Greylag, the yacht sunk by Red Falcon, was successfully raised and recovered on 23 October 2018.

References

External links 

 

Ferries of England
Ferry transport on the Isle of Wight
1994 ships
Ships of Red Funnel